Hapalopilus croceus is a species of polypore fungus. It was originally described by Christian Hendrik Persoon in 1796 as Boletus croceus; Marinus Anton Donk transferred it to genus Hapalopilus in 1933 to give it the name by which it is currently known. The species is found in Asia, Europe, Oceania, and North America, where it grows on the rotting wood of deciduous trees.

References

Polyporaceae
Fungi described in 1796
Fungi of Asia
Fungi of Europe
Fungi of Oceania
Fungi of North America
Taxa named by Christiaan Hendrik Persoon
Fungi without expected TNC conservation status